Naver (Hangul: 네이버) is a South Korean online platform operated by the Naver Corporation. It was launched in 1999 as the first web portal in South Korea to develop and use its own search engine. It was also the world's first operator to introduce the comprehensive search feature, which compiles search results from various categories and presents them in a single page. Naver has since added a multitude of new services ranging from basic features such as e-mail and news to the world's first online Q&A platform Knowledge iN.

As of September 2017, the search engine handled 74.7% of all web searches in South Korea and had 42 million enrolled users. More than 25 million Koreans have Naver as the start page on their default browser and the mobile application has 28 million daily visitors. Naver has also been referred to as 'the Google of South Korea'.

Owing to its rising popularity in Japan, Naver is now competing with Kakao to claim the number one position in Japanese market of web novel and web comic.

History
Naver was created in June 1999 as the first South Korean portal website with a self-developed search engine. In August 2000, Naver began the 'comprehensive search' service, which allows users to get a variety of results from a search query on a single page, organized by type, including blogs, websites, images, web communities, etc. This was five years before Google launched a similar offer with its 'universal search' function.

In the early days of Naver's operation, there was a relative dearth of web pages available in the Korean language. To fill this void, Naver became an early pioneer in user-generated content through the creation of the 'Knowledge iN (Hangul: 네이버 지식인)' service in 2002. In Knowledge iN, users can pose questions on any subject and select among answers provided by other users, awarding points to the users who gives the best answers. Knowledge iN was launched three years before Yahoo! launched its similar 'Yahoo! Answers' service, and now possesses a database of over 200 million answers.

Over the years, Naver has continued to expand its services. It launched its Web comic service 'Webtoon' in 2004 and its personal Blog service in 2005. From 2005 to 2007, Naver expanded its multimedia search services, including music and video search as well as mobile search.

In 2019, Naver reorganized its mobile version of the main screen, excluding search windows and some menus. In response more than 3,000 comments opposing the change have been posted.

Naver introduced new restrictions on comments to protect celebrities from malicious comments by anonymous online audiences in March, 2020. This followed a 2019 incident where a famous singer-actress Sulli committed suicide due to depression after facing a huge amount of malicious comments. Naver also replaced the comment box with facial emojis after criticisms of mental health implications for celebrities.

As of January 19, 2020, Naver now owns Wattpad, an online book service.

In October 2020, Naver was fined 26.7 billion won ($22.9 million) by South Korea's Fair Trade Commission (FTC) for manipulating its algorithm between 2012 and 2015 in favor of its own services such as Smart Store and Naver TV over services provided by rivals. Naver's share in the open market sector increased from 4.97% in 2015 to 21.08% in 2018, while competitors' market shares went down.

Services

Junior Naver
Junior Naver (Hangul: 쥬니어 네이버), also known as Juniver (Hangul: 쥬니버), is a portal website for children considered similar to Yahooligans. Junior Naver offers services such as avatars, educational content, quizzes, videos, Q&A, and a homework helper.  Junior Naver uses a panel of experts and educators to filter out harmful content in order to ensure a safe internet environment for children. Ever since its competitors Daum Kids and Yahoo Kids have closed down, Junior Naver is the only children's portal site operating in Korea.

Naver Webtoon

Naver Webtoon (Hangul: 네이버 웹툰), later simply WEBTOON, is a webcomic platform where users have free access to a variety of webtoons created by professional artists. Users can also pay publishers to view comic books and genre fiction contents online. Naver has incorporated a 'Challenge' section which allows amateurs to post and promote their own works. These days, there are a number of k-dramas that are motivated by these webtoons.

Naver Cafe 
Naver Cafe (Hangul: 네이버 카페) is a service that allows Naver users to create their own internet communities. There were 10.5 million cafes running as of May 2017. One person can make up to 300 cafes.

Naver Blog
Naver Blog (Hangul: 네이버 블로그) started with the name 'paper' in June 2003, and evolved to 'blog' in October 2003. It had 23 million users as of April 2016.

For two weeks from May 1, 2021, Naver held an event to pay up to 16,000 won to people who posted on Naver blog every day. However, this event was ended early due to a number of incidents where people with multiple IDs. Most people who participated in the event criticized Naver's response.Naver announced on its official blog that it would resume its "Today's Diary Challenge (Korean: #오늘일기챌린지)" event, which ended early in three days, from May 24. However, only those who participated in the previously discontinued event (who completed the three-day record) can participate in the event.Naver announced on May 13, 2021, that it would show profile pictures as well if it posts comments on Naver news articles. Previously, it was difficult to recognize users because only four digits in front of the author's ID who commented on Naver news articles were disclosed. Naver expected that it would be easier to recognize users and solve the problem of malicious comments by implementing such services. Critics criticized the company for its censorship of comments.

Naver NOW 

Naver NOW (formerly Naver TV) is a video streaming and share platform which mainly provides web dramas distributed by Naver. Naver NOW was served as the replacement for the Naver TV mobile app while Naver TV was currently serve as web portal.

Naver Pay 
Naver Pay (네이버페이) is an payment service by Naver Financial, a subsidiary company of Naver launched on June 25, 2021. It first started as a payment service for Naver Shopping, but now offers payments in over 97,000 stores both online, and offline and in December 20, started supporting Zero Pay in-app, a government funded payment service. In May 2019, Naver started supporting oversea payment in Japan via Line Pay, allowing users to make payments in stores in Japan without exchanging currencies.

Knowledge IN
Knowledge iN (Hangul: 지식iN), formerly Knowledge Search (Korean:지식검색), is an online Q&A platform launched in October 2002. The tool allows users to ask any question and to receive answers from other users. Knowledge iN was an early example of harnessing user-generated content to expand the amount of information available on the web, particularly in the Korean language. Bradley Horowitz, former Vice President of Product Strategy at Yahoo!, has cited Knowledge iN as the inspiration for Yahoo! Answers, which was launched three years after Naver introduced the original service.

Naver helps with unauthorized publishing in order to attract users to its Knowledge iN service. This contributes to poor quality content on Knowledge iN, as prior answers to a question are left unaltered, and old questions are only allowed small modifications by other netizens. Criticism is also growing as Naver unilaterally controls comments, and edits information that may be against its political positions.

Naver Encyclopedia
Naver Encyclopedia (Hangul: 네이버 사전) consists of a professional database with over 3 million entries from many different encyclopedias. More than 1000 experts in physics, food, film, and other fields are producing 45 kinds of specialized content in the encyclopedia of Naver knowledge, and 50,000 headwords are accumulated. The Naver Knowledge Encyclopedia also deals with more than 100 public institutions and has received over 900 kinds of DBs.

Naver Mail 
Naver Mail (Hangul: 네이버 메일) is an e-mail service that anyone who is a user of Naver can use. Each person is given up to 5GB of storage.

PRISM Live Studio 
PRISM Live Studio (Hangul: 프리즘 라이브 스튜디오) is a live streaming application for both mobile and PC. Streamers can simultaneously broadcast to multiple platforms, also known as simulcasting, while using up to 1080p HD all without increasing the network usage. Platforms supported includes YouTube, Facebook, Twitch, Periscope, V Live, Naver TV, afreecaTV, KakaoTV and RTMP channels. The application can also be used for video editing purposes.

Search engine features and restrictions 

Naver's closed platform is frequently mentioned. Other search engines are not allowed to search their knowledge base and blogs, monopolizing Naver's control over its properties. In April 2011, the second and third portal sites in Korea, Daum and Nate, signed a Memorandum of Understanding (MoU) to open their search for services such as cafe and blogs. Naver did not choose to participate in this MoU.

Naver had been criticized because they abused Real-time Search Terms (Korean: 급상승 검색어) to create public opinion. Therefore, Naver abolished Real-time Search Terms on 25 February 2021.

Person-related Search Terms (Korean: 인물 연관 검색어) of Naver had been criticized because of the tendency to include defamatory searches. Naver abolished Person-related Search Terms in March 2021.

Comparison between Google and Naver (Korean: 구글 네이버 비교) A Korean reporter is giving a detailed comparison between Google and Naver. There are differences with each advantage.

See also

 Naver Corporation
 Band
 Line

References

External links
 
 Naver Webtoon
 Naver Cafe
 Naver Blog
 Naver TV
 Knowledge iN

Blog hosting services
Webmail
Internet search engines
Naver Corporation
Web portals
Internet television streaming services
Livestreaming software
1999 establishments in South Korea